Colonel Frederic Richard Thomas Trench Gascoigne DSO JP (4 July 1851 – 2 June 1937) was a British soldier and landowner.

Early life
He was born on 4 July 1851, the only son of Frederic Charles Trench Gascoigne JP, and his wife, the former Mary Isabella Oliver Gascoigne.

His mother was the elder daughter and co-heir of Richard Oliver Gascoigne of Parlington Hall, Yorkshire and Castle Oliver, County Limerick. His aunt Elizabeth Oliver Gascoigne was the wife of Frederick Mason Trench, 2nd Baron Ashtown.

Career
Gascoigne was a captain in the Royal Horse Guards and served in the Egyptian War of 1884 to 1885. He was second-in-command and later commanding officer of the 3rd Battalion Imperial Yeomanry in the Second Boer War in South Africa from 1900 to 1901, and was awarded the Distinguished Service Order in 1900. He was lieutenant-colonel and honorary colonel commanding the Yorkshire Hussars in 1903 and an honorary colonel in the British Army in 1904.

Colonel Gascoigne was a Justice of the Peace for the West Riding of Yorkshire, an officer of the Order of St John of Jerusalem, and a member of the Army and Navy Club, the Carlton Club and the Junior Carlton, the Yorkshire Club in York and the Royal Yacht Squadron in Cowes. He was selected High Sheriff of Yorkshire from 1923 to 1924.

Personal life
In 1892, he married Laura Gwendolen (1859–1949), daughter of Sir Douglas Galton and the former Marianne Nicholson. Through her mother Laura was the goddaughter and second cousin to Florence Nightingale. Together, they had two children, a son and a daughter:

 Sir Alvary Douglas Frederick Trench-Gascoigne (1893–1970), who served as the British Political Representative to Japan from 1946 to 1951; he married Sylvia Wilder, daughter of Brig.-Gen. Wilber Elliott Wilder, in 1916.
 Cynthia Mary Trench-Gascoigne (1898–1990), who married Arthur Fitzgerald Sandys Hill, 6th Baron Sandys.
 Edward Oliver Trench Gascoigne (1896–1896), who died as an infant.

The Gascoignes lived at Lotherton Hall, Aberford, Leeds (which he inherited from his aunt, Lady Ashtown, upon her death in February 1893), and Craignish Castle, Ardfern, Argyllshire. Trench Gascoigne died on 2 June 1937. His widow died on 2 July 1949.

References

1851 births
1937 deaths
Companions of the Distinguished Service Order
Officers of the Order of St John
Royal Horse Guards officers
Yorkshire Hussars officers
High Sheriffs of Yorkshire